Donald M. Weisman (November 4, 1924 - May 30, 2016) was an American entomologist. He is known for his work on the taxonomy of immature Lepidoptera.

Biography
Weisman was born in 1924. In 1950, he received his bachelor's degree in entomology from Miami University, followed by a master's degree 10 years later in North Carolina State University. A year after, he received his MA degree. He was appointed as an entomologist with Insect Identification and Parasite Introduction Research Branch, in the United States Department of Agriculture. He also worked for United States National Museum as an assistant for taxonomic work. He retired from USDA and Systematic Entomology Laboratory in 1986.

References

American entomologists
1924 births
North Carolina State University alumni
Miami University alumni
2016 deaths